Francine is a 2012 American-Canadian drama film written and directed by Brian M. Cassidy and Melanie Shatzky and starring Melissa Leo.  It is Cassidy and Shatzky's directorial debut.

Plot

Cast
Melissa Leo as Francine
Victoria Charkut as Linda
Dave Clark as Pet Shop Manager
Keith Leonard as Ned
Laurent Rejto as Clergy Member
Barbara Sebring-Forman as Hellen
Jonathan Shatzky as Victor

Production
The film was shot in the Hudson Valley of New York.

Reception
The film has a 60% rating on Rotten Tomatoes. Roger Ebert gave the film three and a half stars out of four. Michael Phillips of the Chicago Tribune gave the film three stars. Keith Uhlich of Time Out gave the film four stars out of five. Eric Kohn of IndieWire gave the film a B−.

References

External links
 
 

2012 films
American drama films
Films shot in New York (state)
English-language Canadian films
Canadian drama films
2012 drama films
2012 directorial debut films
2010s English-language films
2010s American films
2010s Canadian films